Butterfly is a 2022 Indian Telugu-language mystery thriller film directed by Ghanta Satish Babu and starring Anupama Parameswaran. The film was released directly on Disney+ Hotstar.

Cast 
Anupama Parameswaran as Geeta
Nihal Kodhaty as Viswa
Bhumika Chawla as Vyjayanthi
Rao Ramesh
Praveen

Reception 
A critic from 123telugu wrote that "On the whole, Butterfly is a routine crime thriller that can be watched for Anupama Parameswaran’s performance alone". A critic from The Times of India wrote that "This attempted thriller is an assault on one’s senses. However, Anupama’s performance and decent production values are the takeaways from this otherwise passable film". A critic from The New Indian Express wrote that "Anupama Parameswaran is perhaps the only lifeline of the film, playing an exhausted, helpless woman thrown into an arduous situation".

References